A safety reflector is a retroreflector intended for pedestrians, runners, motorized and non-motorized vehicles. A safety reflector is similar to reflective stripes that can be found on safety vests and clothing worn by road workers and rescue workers. They are sometimes erroneously called luminous badges or luminous tags, but this is incorrect as they do not themselves produce light, but only reflect it.

A safety reflector aids visibility of a person or vehicle visible to on the road, as it reflects light from headlights of vehicles. Safety reflectors are especially useful where there are no streetlights.

Unlike reflective stripes that are permanently fixed to clothing, the safety reflector is a stand-alone device that can be attached to any article of clothing as needed, often using a safety pin and some string. For vehicles, the reflector is usually a fixed part. In bicycles, reflectors are usually on wheels, pedals, under the seat, on the back of the luggage rack, and in front of the front fork. In motorcycles, automobiles, and other vehicles, reflectors are built into the front and rear ends (and sides) next to the headlights and brake lights.

Issue
Fatal traffic accidents at night often involve vehicles with drivers who fail to see pedestrians or bicyclists until they are too close to avoid collision. Reflectors are expected to increase visibility and contribute to safety.

History

The reflector was first invented in 1917 in Nice by Henri Chrétien to provide the army a communication system the enemy could not intercept. Patent is labelled cataphote in 1923.

The cataphote was also invented by Garbarini by combining a convex lens and concave mirror. It was used for aviation, safety in Switzerland and advertising in France.

On 12 March 1925, the minister, the Réseau du Nord railway company and the Touring-Club de France  experienced the use of cataphotes to make level crossings visible by night.

In 1926, an automobile club, the Touring-Club de France, offered 180 signals with triangular cataphote to warn for the presence of the level crossings. In 1927, fines were given in France to car owners which did not have the cataphote made mandatory by law. The same year, cataphote were sold for motorized vehicles, motorbikes, bicycles and any kind of trailers.

In 1946, French regulation for catadioptre was NF R 143 11.

On first January 1950, safety catadioptre were made mandatory on the rear side of French vehicles.

In January 1943, a US highway patrolman Raymond Trask proposed the concept of the single cataphote for pedestrians to help them be visible for drivers in a Popular Science publication.

The reflector is a Finnish creation, invented by a farmer Mr. Arvi Lehti from Pertteli, a small township in Western Finland. The inventor did not consider pedestrian safety when creating the first reflectors: he simply wished to protect his horse carts and carriages. Reflectors were introduced to Finns in 1960. Nowadays one can find reflectors of all possible shapes and colours, as design and fashion industries have turned their faces towards this diminutive gadget. Special 'clip-on' reflectors for bicycles and other human-powered vehicles are also common.

On first November 1963, Unece regulation number 3 entered into force in its original version.

European regulations

Reflector for vulnerable users and non motorized vehicles

Within the European Union, safety reflectors for pedestrians must be certified to comply with the CE EN 13356 safety standard. This standard is specifically for "loose, reflective accessories for personal use". There are other standards for other types of reflectors such as safety vests and reflectors on bicycles.

In Finland, Estonia, Latvia and Lithuania, pedestrians are required by law to wear safety reflectors when walking during dark conditions.

Reflector for motorized vehicles
The EU use Unece regulation number 3 to categorize safety reflectors in several class: IA, IB, IIIA, IIIB and IVA.

The EU use Unece regulation 104 for retro-reflective markings for vehicles of category M2 and M3 (transport of people), N (transport of good), O2, O3 and O4 (trailers). This regulation use colored markings.

The EU also has in its law the Council Directive 76/757/EEC of 27 July 1976 on the approximation of the laws of the Member States relating to reflex reflectors for motor vehicles and their trailers.

Image gallery

Bicycle reflector

A bicycle reflector or prism reflector is a common safety device found on the rear, front and wheels of bicycles. It uses the principle of retroreflection to alert another road user of the bicycle's presence on the road.

The reflector is usually manufactured in the form of a moulded tile of transparent plastic. The outside surface is smooth, allowing light, such as from a car's headlights, to enter. The rear surface of the tile takes the form of an array of angled micro-prisms or spherical beads.

The light striking the rear, inside surface of the prisms or beads, does so at an angle greater than the critical angle thus it undergoes total internal reflection. Due to the orientation of the other inside surfaces, any light internally reflecting is directed back out the front of the reflector in the direction it came from. This alerts the person close to the light source, e.g. the driver of the vehicle, to the presence of the cyclist.

See also
High-visibility clothing

References

External links 
 Driving simulator that highlights the benefits of safety reflectors (Finnish Road Safety Council)

Vehicle parts
Fashion accessories
Safety equipment
Finnish inventions